Phnum Lieb is a khum (commune) of Preah Netr Preah District in Banteay Meanchey Province in north-western Cambodia.

Villages
Phnum Lieb is composed of 16 villages:

Phnum Lieb Kaeut
Phnum Lieb Lech
Troyoung
Tro Louk Cheung
Tro Louk Lech
Tro Louk Tboung
Laote
Rumduol
Pring Chu
Kantrab
Tnaot
Anlong Sar
Kandaol
Kambaor
Kabau
Kampong Krasang

References

Communes of Banteay Meanchey province
Preah Netr Preah District